Doug Socha (born c. 1975) is an American football coach. He is the head football coach at Keiser University in West Palm Beach, Florida, a position he has held since the program's inception in 2018. Socha led the Keiser Seahawks to the NAIA Football National Championship title game in 2022.

Socha graduated from California State University, Northridge in 1999. From 2000 to 2005, he was an assistant football coach at the University at Buffalo. Socha spent four years, 2006 to 2009, as an assistant coach at the American Heritage School in Florida, before he was promoted to head coach in 2010. He led American Heritage to the class 3A state championship in 2011, but resigned from his post the following June. In August 2012, Socha was hired as the first head coach of the new football program at Oxbridge Academy in West Palm Beach.

Head coaching record

College

References

External links
 Keiser profile

Year of birth missing (living people)
1970s births
Living people
Buffalo Bulls football coaches
Keiser Seahawks football coaches
High school football coaches in Florida
California State University, Northridge alumni